The Agios Minas Cathedral  is a Greek Orthodox Cathedral in Heraklion, Greece, serving as the seat of the Archbishop of Crete. Ιt is dedicated to Saint Menas the martyr and wonderworker (285-309 A.D.), who is the patron saint of Heraklion.

History
It was built from 1862 to 1895. The construction was interrupted during the Cretan Revolution of 1866–1869. The church has a cruciform architecture with a central dome. The floor plan of the church has external maximum dimensions of 43,20 m length and 29.50 m width and a surface area of 1,350 m2. It is the largest cathedral in Crete and one of the largest in Greece. A small and old church of Agios Minas is located in the proximity of the cathedral.

Gallery

See also
List of large Orthodox cathedrals

References

External links 
 

Minas
Eastern Orthodoxy in Crete
Buildings and structures in Heraklion
Tourist attractions in Crete
Church buildings with domes
Churches in Crete
Churches completed in 1895
19th-century churches in Greece